This is a list of works written by the Northern Ireland composer Seán Doherty.

Chamber
The Devil's Dream String Quartet No.3 (2015)
 Arch for String Quartet (2014)
 Fugue State for flute, clarinet, cello and piano (2013)
 Retreat for String Quartet (2013)
 Springar For voice flute, viola d’amore, piccolo, cello, and harpsichord (2013)
 Pitched Battle  for flute, clarinet, piano, violin and cello (2012)

Choral
 A Nywe Werk for a cappella choir (SSAATTBB) (2014)
 Under-Song for a cappella choir (SSAATTBB) (2014)
 Dreams for a cappella choir (SATB) (2014)
 Easter Wings for a cappella choir and organ (SSAATTBB) (2013)
 Et Clamabant for a cappella choir (SATB) (2013)
 Jubilate Deo for a cappella choir and organ (SATB) (2012)
 Doire for a cappella choir (SATB) (2012)

Stage
 Love has no Why for soloist, singers and string quartet (2013)
 Totalled, opera (2013)
 Number Seven for tenor, harp/piano and chorus (2012)

Solo
 Divisions for violin (2015)
 Long after sudden flash for piano (2011)

Orchestral
 Hive Mind for orchestra (2015)

Doherty, Sean